Guimba, officially the Municipality of Guimba, is a 1st class municipality in the province of Nueva Ecija, Philippines. According to the 2020 census, it has a population of 127,653 people.

It was incorporated by the King of Spain by virtue of a royal decree in 1897.

Etymology
Guimba came from the Ilocano term 'Gebba' which was the process of heating molded clay pots in a pit until they turn reddish and durable. Tree stumps were made into large pieces of charcoal. The live charcoals were placed underneath the clay pots. After a few hours these were hardened and ready to bring out from the pit and ready for use.

The story goes, once a Spanish visited the place where most of the residents are engaged in pottery making. The foreigner stopped and asked the earth-bakers this question in a nasalized manner, 'Que lugar este?'. The foreigner asked what this place was. The natives misunderstood the question and were asked what they were doing, so they answered “GEBBA” pointing to the ground. The Spaniard repeated the word as they left the place “GHEBHA” after years have gone by the name of the place was hispanized into Guimba when the Spaniard founded the town as Pueblo en la provincia de Nueva Ecija. This pottery-making tradition is prevalent even in other barangays outside the central area of the town. An example is Barangay Pasong Intsik, which was named after 'old jars containing Chinese remains' were once found beneath a bridge.

The early Ilocano settlers brought with them the wonder image of Apo San Juan so they called the place San Juan de Guimba. In the American period, a resolution on the town separated the term 'Guimba' from 'Apo San Juan', thus its present name. But Apo San Juan remains as its Patron Saint. The pottery traditions of the indigenous settlers were later disintegrated and lost due to population influx from the Ilocos region and other areas in the south.

History

What is now the town of Guimba was once a vast ecological rainforest which was part of the Central Luzon Rainforest during precolonial time, before the arrival of the Spanish. The area is believed to be inhabited by no permanent communities, rather, it is inhabited by hunter-gatherer societies, mainly Ilonggots. The area was once part of the huge territory that the Empire of Tondo, with its capital in a much forested Manila. In the collapse of the Empire of Tondo after the subjugation of Brunei, the area was transitioned into a free zone once again, where hunter-gatherers abounded. The area is also believed to once have been visited by migrating Aetas, Cordillerans, Ilokanos, and Ilonggots.

The first Ilocano settlers, arriving in wooden carts and horsebacks, cleared the thick forests and planted the first rice seeds on February 20, 1865, according to an old and brownish record found by Guimba's former Parish priest, Rev. Agustin "Gus" Polong, MSC. They called the area 'San Juan de Guimba' in honor of the patron saint the settlers brought from Ilocos, San Juan, and combined it with the pot-making industry called 'gebba' which they used to do in the old land. Since then, rice became the primary agricultural crop in the area. Due to this, it became the province of Nueva Ecija's traditional top rice-producing area in the 20th century.

More settlers arrived mostly from the old towns of Bacarra, Paoay, and Candon of the Ilocos provinces. Among the families who came were the Galapons, Mateos, Cudals, Padres, Cayogs, Romanos, Silvestres, Capinpuyans, Batangans, Faigals, Ramoses, Sumawangs, and Catabonas. What would be the town of Guimba is a relatively organized community when the Spanish colonialists arrived and appointed Don Luis De Ocampo as the first Gobernadorcillo, and later, Don Pablo Ramos and Santiago Cudal.

The Spanish left and the Americans came and in 1912, the town's name was abbreviated to Guimba with Don Alfonso Faigal as the first Alcalde Mayor. St. John the Evangelist though remains to be its patron saint. The first municipal hall was also built during this year in what is now known as Faigal Street. The Plaza Municipal evolved and what will become the public market started its commerce.

A foot bridge was constructed during the administration of the late Agustin Vigilia, Alcalde Mayor. This foot bridge was constructed across the Binituran River leading to the northern barrios like San Andres, Balbalino, Gueset, Baybayabas, Cinence, Nangabulan to barangay Talugtug from the Parairo Street.

Later this wooden bridge was demolished and transferred it to the present site north of the Faigal St. This was known as Faigal Bridge going to the north, to the municipality of Talugtug. Other infrastructures were put up with the public market and cleared the space for the Municipal Plaza, now the midtown municipal park.

In 1941, during the Japanese regime the late Juan Villamar was appointed Municipal Mayor. During World War II, the Imperial Japanese military forces entered and occupied Guimba in 1942. At daybreak of January 26, to August 15, 1945, advance reconnaissance units of the American troops under the U.S. Army 6th Infantry Division and aided by the local Filipino soldiers of the Philippine Commonwealth Army 2nd, 22nd, 25th and 26th Infantry Division liberated Guimba and, within hours, established outposts nine miles farther to the east along the Licab River and La Paz. Combined U.S. and Philippine Commonwealth military forces liberated the town of Guimba in 1945 and ended World War II.

In 1963, Dr. Virgilio Calica was the Mayor and it was during his term that the old Municipal Hall was constructed, the present site of our new municipal hall constructed in year 2004. This building was demolished during the administration of Jose Bopet Dizon and the new Municipal Hall was constructed and occupied in 2006.

In 2006, Guimba became a first class municipality. The municipality is now known not just for its agriculture significance but also for its festival, Ragragsak Ti-Guimba.

Geography
Guimba is located on the western part of the province.

Land 
Guimba covers a land area of 25,853.2330 hectares. It have three recognized types of soil in its territory:
 Bantug Clay loam
 Guingua slit loam
 San Fabian Clay loam

Barangays 
Guimba is politically subdivided into 64 barangays.  Four are considered urban barangays while 60 are classified as rural barangays.

Climate 

There are two types of climate in the town. Dry season from November to June. And rainy seasons from July to October.

Demographics

Economy 

Most Guimbanians derive their income from agriculture. As such, the agriculture sector ranks first in terms of generating employment for the populace. At the end of year 2006, Guimba had a total labor force of 38,120

Guimba economy revolves mainly on agriculture. However, there are also cottages, small and medium scale industries. Local producers are involved in the manufacture of furniture, food processing, panara making, native rice cakes, palay buying, auto parts, clothing, subdivisions, cosmetics, medicine, and construction.

As of 2017, Guimba has a Total Income of P289,497,138.89;Assets of P556,825,821.59;Liabilities of P165,318,650.14 and Equity of P296,965,545.59

The town has an employment rate of 74%.

Shopping Centers and Supermarkets
 Puregold
 Primark Town Center Guimba
 Friendship Supermarket
 Novo

Government
Municipal elected official (2013–present):
Jose R. Dizon, Mayor
Dr. Jesulito Galapon, Vice Mayor
Councilors:
Darlene Jahne Antoinette Beltran
Stephanie Alvarez
Julius Gregfort Lumang
Jose Eulogio Rosalino Dizon
Anthony Ubaldo
Virgilio Fabros
George Cabatbat
Eric Mateo

List of former mayors
Spanish Period
 1.	Don Luis de Ocampo
 2.	Don Pablo Ramos
 3.	Don Santiago Cudal

American Period to Contemporary Period:

Culture

Intangible Cultural Heritage
The Ragragsak ti Guimba is the annual festival of Guimba. It is composed of various events that begins at February and ends at March, preparations normally start at January. The highlights include opening Mass, Ms. Guimba, basketball competitions, Ms. Gay, Mr. Teen, band, and street dancing which is the most popular.

The town formerly was known for its potteries, which were introduced by its first settlers from the Ilocos region. However, the tradition vanished sometime before or after the Philippine Revolution.

The town also possessed a rice-pounding tradition during full moons, however, the tradition vanished during the martial law period in the 1980s.

Tangible Cultural Heritage

In accordance to Article V Section 4 of the National Heritage Act of 2009 Republic Act 10066, the Philippine Registry of Cultural Property (PRECUP), the repository of all information pertaining to cultural properties in the Philippines deemed significant to Filipino cultural heritage, was established and came to effect last 2009.

Aside from cultural agencies of the government, the law also mandates the Cultural Office of the LGU to establish a "Local Important Cultural Properties List and Documents" as declared by the Sanggunian. These are cultural properties which are significant to local culture and history of Guimba.

Among the ways to register a cultural property in the PRECUP are: (1) Local government units, through their cultural offices, shall likewise maintain an inventory of cultural property under its jurisdiction and shall furnish the commission a copy of the same; and (2) Private collectors and owners shall register their cultural property to the National Museum. Registered cultural properties shall remain in the possession of their private owners.

A building, monuments, or zone aged 50 and above is considered a 'heritage structure.' Archives, books, and works of art with high significance to local culture and history is considered a 'heritage object.' All of which can be registered in the PRECUP.

The Municipality of Guimba, as of 2017, has yet to submit any cultural property to the PRECUP.

The cultural properties of Guimba that may be submitted for registration in the PRECUP includes:
St. John the Baptist Parish Church, known also as Guimba Church - known for its intricate depiction of the mysteries of Christ at its two aisles, its huge altar painting depicting heaven and earth ruled by God, and its ceiling painting which depict rice stalks, the town's main product
Old Municipal Building - established during the American period and has been the former seat of power of the municipality
Ruins of the Philippine National Railway Station in Guimba - which is one of the few connective rail stations in Nueva Ecija
Triala's Mansion - formerly owned by Nueva Ecija's revolutionary leader, General Manuel Tinio
Faigal Bridge and other Spanish and American period bridges within the municipality
Historic Guimba Public Cemetery
Various Spanish and American Era Ancestral Houses - many need urgent conservation as many houses have been demolished already in favor of non-traditional cement buildings 
Various barangay landmark sculptures like those in Pasong Inchik's intersection road
Various artifacts and books in Guimba's heritage centers
Our Lady of the Sacred Heart College of Guimba campus - one of the oldest educational institution in the town
Bartolome National High School - possesses the Gabaldon architectural style, a unique architectural style of the Philippines

Environmental Heritage
Prior to Spanish arrival, the entire town of Guimba was completely covered with rainforests. Philippine deer, Luzon warty pig, bleeding heart doves, and Philippine eagles were present as locals or passerby species. In the American period, agriculture was increased and the forest cover began to deplete. By the end of the 21st century, all big aves and wild mammals went extinct, while the forest cover was calculated to be less than 5% of its original extent.

Healthcare
Guimba General Hospital, Inc. - Address: Bagain St. Santa Veronica District, Guimba, Nueva Ecija
Guimba Community Hospital (Guimba Meternity & Lying-in Clinic)
other clinics and brgy. health centers served the populace around the Municipality of Guimba.

Education
Education in Guimba is taught by various educational institutions in the municipality which offer mostly Information Technology, Hotel and Restaurant Management, and Teacher Education. Other courses are subsidized by Nueva Ecija's only state university, Central Luzon State University, located in the municipality of Munoz and other colleges in Cabanatuan, the province' regional economic center. Guimba's educational institutions include:

 Our Lady of the Sacred Heart College, Inc or OLSHCO formerly OLSHA (Barangay St. John)
 La Fortuna College Guimba Branch (Barangay Santa Veronica)
 AMA Computer Learning Center Guimba Branch (Ongjianco St, Barangay St. Veronica)
 College for Research and Technology or CRT (Saranay District)
 World Citi College or WCC (Barangay Saranay)
 ETO School of Science and Technology (Barangay Santa Veronica)
 BLUN - Bonifacio Luz Natividad Educational Foundation (St. John District, Guimba, Nueva Ecija)
 Bartolome Sangalang National High School (formerly, Guimba National High School. Barangay St. John)
 Triala National High School (Barangay Triala)
 Nagpandayan High School (Barangay Nagpandayan)
 Galvan National High School (Barangay Galvan)
 San Andres National High School(Barangay San Andres)
 Pacac High School (Barangay Pacac)
 Manacsac High School (formerly Nagpandayan High School Annex. Barangay Manacsac)
 Bartolome Sangalang National High School Annex (Barangay Macatcatuit)
 College of Advance Technology and Management (Barangay San Roque)

Guimba has a literacy rate of 97%.

Infrastructure

 ROADS and Total length in km.
 a) National roads.......................	41.760
 b) Provincial roads.....................	44.700
 c) Municipal............................	15.600
 d) Barangay.............................   153.720
 BRIDGES in length (m)
 Bridge along National Road
 Barangay___Length (m)
 1. Bunol.................................5.00
 2. Bacayao..............................36.00
 Bridge along Provincial Road
 1. Cavite...............................24.00
 2. Tampac I..............................5.00
 Bridge along Barangay Road
 1. Sinulatan............................12.00
 2. Santa Lucia...........................24.00
 3.1 Santa Ana............................12.00
 3.2 Bonsobre............................12.00
 4.1 Macapabellag........................12.00
 4.2 Macapabellag.........................6.00
 5. Balbalino............................36.00
 6. Casongsong...........................16.00
 7. Macamias.............................36.00
 8. San Miguel............................6.00
 9.1 Nagpandayan.........................36.00
 9.2 Nagpandayan..........................6.00
 10. Yuzon................................6.00
 TOTAL:.................................220.00 m.
 DAM / SWIP ( small water impounding project)
 Covering Barangays:
 a) Barangay San Marcelino..................(8 has.)
 b) Barangay Catimon........................(5 has. 15 km long)
 c) Barangay Lennec	(San Felipe)...........(60 has.)
 NIA (Phase I / Casecnan)
 Covering Barangays
 1) Naglabrahan
 2) Bunol
 3) Cabaruan
 4) Culong
 5) Triala
 6) San Bernardino
 7) Caballero
 8) Santa Cruz
 9) Tampac II & III
 10) Tampac I
 11) Manacsac
 12) Cardinal
 13) Nagpandayan
 14) Agcano
 15) San Roque
 16) Bantug
 17) Banitan
 18) Catimon
 19) Casongsong
 20) Narvacan II

More than half of Guimba's energy is taken from hydro power plants, making it a sustainable town.

Its communications is mainly handles by Digitel, while Globe, Touch Mobile, Dito, and Smart are the predominant cellphone services used.

References

External links

 
 [ Philippine Standard Geographic Code]
Philippine Census Information
Local Governance Performance Management System 

Municipalities of Nueva Ecija